The Olyokma is a tributary of the Lena in eastern Siberia.  

The river gives its name to the Olyokma-Chara Plateau, located to the west of its western bank.

History
In the summer of 1631, Russian pioneer Pyotr Beketov entered the Olyokma during his first voyage down the Lena and in 1636 he founded the present-day city of Olyokminsk near the mouth of the river on the left bank of Lena.  

Yerofey Khabarov used this river's route to travel from the Lena to the Amur during his mid-17th century expeditions. In the spring of 1649 Khabarov set off at his own expense up the Olyokma, then up its tributary, the Tungir and portaged to the Shilka River, reaching the upper Amur (Dauria) in early 1650.

Course
The Olyokma rises in the Muroy Range, Olyokma-Stanovik Highlands (Олёкминский Становик), west of Mogocha. It flows through remote terrain and cuts across the Kalar Range of the Stanovoy Highlands through a narrow valley. Further north it bends around the eastern end of the Udokan Range and flows roughly north before joining the Lena near Olyokminsk.

To the west flows the Vitim, to the south the Shilka and Amur, and to the east the upper Aldan. Its main tributaries are the Tungir, the Nyukzha and the Chara —with its tributary the Tokko.

See also
List of rivers of Russia
Olyokma Nature Reserve

References

External links

Rivers of the Sakha Republic